Tinde van Andel is an ethnobotanist.  She is the Special professor of the Clusius chair of History of Botany and Gardens at Leiden University.  Using ethnobotany and genomics, she studies how human populations and plant species migrated from Africa to the New World.

References

External links 

 Tinde van Andel web page at the Naturalis Biodiversity Center

Year of birth missing (living people)
Living people
Ethnobotanists
Women botanists
21st-century Dutch botanists